Utricularia chrysantha, the sun bladderwort, is a medium-sized annual, terrestrial carnivorous plant that belongs to the genus Utricularia. U. chrysantha is endemic to southern New Guinea and Australia. It grows as a terrestrial species  in wet grasslands or Melaleuca-Acacia savannas at low altitudes near sea level. It was originally described and published by Robert Brown in 1810.

See also 
 List of Utricularia species

References 

chrysantha
Carnivorous plants of Australia
Carnivorous plants of Asia
Flora of Papua New Guinea
Flora of Western New Guinea
Flora of Queensland
Flora of the Northern Territory
Eudicots of Western Australia
Lamiales of Australia
Plants described in 1810